Briarwood Estates is an unincorporated community and census-designated place (CDP) in Jefferson County, Missouri, United States. It is in the southern part of the county, northwest of De Soto. It is a residential community built around three lakes: Lake Briarwood, Fishermans Lake, and Spring Lake. Missouri Route 21 passes between Briarwood Estates and De Soto, leading northeast  to St. Louis and southwest  to Potosi.

Briarwood Estates was first listed as a CDP prior to the 2020 census.

Demographics

References 

Census-designated places in Jefferson County, Missouri
Census-designated places in Missouri